Karabar High School is a government-funded co-educational dual modality partially academically selective and comprehensive secondary day school, located on Donald Road, Karabar, a suburb of Queanbeyan in the Southern Tablelands region of New South Wales, Australia.

Established in 1977, the school enrolled approximately 1,140 students in 2018, from Year 7 to Year 12, of whom ten percent identified as Indigenous Australians and 21 percent were from a language background other than English. The school is operated by the NSW Department of Education; the principal is Anne-Marie Shannon.

Overview 
Since 2010, it has been a partially selective high school, with a selective class being run with each subsequent year group beginning at the school. The school caters for a range of academic and vocational demands, and has a full-time support unit.

The school has had a recent boost in popularity, with the on-campus student population growing by around 100 people each year.  In 2015 the New South Wales Government announced that the distance education centre would move to Queanbeyan High School.

Other extra-curricular activities
Karabar High School has been involved in many extra-curricular activities over the years. A school production is also put on every year by the school's group of performing arts students. Karabar has  participated in the RoboCup on a number of occasions. The school regularly enters teams in a range of sports, including rugby league, cricket, soccer, AFL, basketball, netball and hockey. The school also runs debating and public speaking groups, depending on student demand and a school cattle team.

School facilities
The school caters for a wide range of academic and vocational pursuits, with a number of upgrades and refurbishments having taken place over the past ten years. The school is divided into seven faculties: English; Human Societies and its Environment (HSIE); Maths; Science; Technical and Applied Studies (TAS); Creative and Performing Arts (CAPA); and Personal Development, health and Physical Education (PDHPE).

Library
The school's library serves as the primary research centre. In 2015, for the second year in a row, the library hosted the 'Write a Book in a Day' event. Students collaborated with one of the English teachers in the library for a period of twelve hours to raise awareness and money for charity.

See also

 List of government schools in New South Wales
 List of selective high schools in New South Wales
 Selective school (New South Wales)
 Education in Australia

References

External links
 

Public high schools in New South Wales
Educational institutions established in 1977
1977 establishments in Australia
Queanbeyan
Selective schools in New South Wales